The Samuel Pleasants Parsons House is a historic dwelling located at 601 Spring Street in Richmond, Virginia. It is best known for being the home of quaker, abolitionist, and prison superintendent Samuel Pleasants Parsons. It is likely that this house was once a stop on the Underground Railroad. It is the oldest remaining building within the Oregon Hill neighborhood.

History

Samuel Parsons had his residence built in 1818 around his time as the superintendent at the Virginia State Penitentiary which too stood on spring street across Belvedere Street. The dwelling is the only surviving building of "Harvie's Plan" of 1817. Beginning in the 1870s, the dwelling was used to house unwed mothers and later served the Virginia Department of Corrections as a refuge for young female offenders in their work release program.

By the turn of the 21st century, the house had fallen into despair, graffiti covered the walls, and a decade had passed since the dwelling had been inhabited. In 2000, local developer Robin Miller renovated the dwelling and now it serves as apartments.

Architecture 
The Federalist-Style house was originally built in 1818 with additions being added in later years. It has a gabled roof and a Greek Revival portico on each of its front entrances. Important interior details survive, such as fireplace mantels and some woodwork.

References

National Register of Historic Places in Richmond, Virginia
Buildings and structures in Richmond, Virginia
Buildings and structures completed in 1818
Underground Railroad locations
Greek Revival architecture in Virginia
Federal architecture in Virginia